Sweep (foaled 1907 in Kentucky) was an American Thoroughbred racehorse.

Background
Sweep was bred by James R. Keene. He was sired by Kentucky Derby winner Ben Brush out of the Domino mare Pink Domino. he was trained by James Rowe.
Sweep was a Champion two-year-old with a long stride. He placed second in the Hopeful Stakes and the Saratoga Special Stakes before he won the Futurity Stakes by over half a dozen lengths under a tight hold.

Racing at three, with jockey James Butwell aboard, Sweep won the 1910 Belmont Stakes in a time of 2:22 when the race was contested at 1 3/8 miles. He was the favorite at 1 to 10 odds and won by six lengths over the only other starter, Duke of Ormonde. It was one of only five times in the history of the stakes race that just two horses have been entered.

Retirement
Retired to Keene's Castleton Farm, in 1917 Sweep was the leading sire of two-year-olds. He was the leading sire by earnings of all horses in 1918 and again in 1925.  He was a great sire and broodmare sire, with three daughters that produced Kentucky Derby winners.  They were Beaming Beauty, dam of Bubbling Over; Brushup, dam of War Admiral; and Dust Whirl, dam of Whirlaway.  Both War Admiral and Whirlaway became Triple Crown champions.

His daughter Washoe Belle became the foundation mare to whom trace Forward Pass, Alydar, Princess Turia, T.V. Lark., etc.

Another daughter, La Chica, became the foundation mare to whom trace Grey Flight and Native Dancer, which bring the Northern Dancer and Mr. Prospector lines.

Other successful progeny include Eternal, General Thatcher, The Porter, Leonardo, Bon Homme, and Pen Rose.

Sweep died in 1936.

Pedigree

References

Matriarchs of the Turf

1907 racehorse births
1936 racehorse deaths
Racehorses bred in Kentucky
Racehorses trained in the United States
Belmont Stakes winners
American Champion racehorses
United States Champion Thoroughbred Sires
Thoroughbred family 8-c
Chefs-de-Race